Amanda de Cadenet is a British photographer, author, and media personality based in Los Angeles, United States. She began her entertainment career in the 1990s, first as a presenter for British series The Word and The Big Breakfast before moving to Los Angeles to briefly pursue an acting career. A tabloid figure at the time, she transitioned to a more private career as a photographer in the 2000s. She has hosted an eponymous interview series on the Lifetime Channel.

Career

1990–1999: Early career 
At age 18, de Cadenet began her career as a co-presenter for The Word, a late-night Channel 4 entertainment show in 1990–1995. She also co-hosted the British television show The Big Breakfast.

Her career and reputation as a 'wild child' made her a British tabloid figure and she became only more well known when she married Duran Duran bassist John Taylor in 1991 at age 19. They moved from the United Kingdom to Los Angeles the following year. She embarked upon a short-lived movie career, appearing in Allison Anders's segment of the 1995 anthology film Four Rooms, Fall (1997) and Brokedown Palace (1999).

2000–present: New ventures 
Her career then turned to fashion and portrait photography, working for magazines such as Spin, Jane and Harper’s Bazaar, among others. In 2005, she published a photo book entitled Rare Birds. Her celebrity subjects have included Drew Barrymore, Sofia Coppola, Demi Moore, Olivia Wilde, Mary J. Blige, Keanu Reeves, Beck Hansen, and the members of The Strokes.

In the 2010s, she returned to television and worked on a series of eponymous interview projects. In 2011, it was announced that de Cadenet would be the host of a new television interview series called The Conversation with Amanda de Cadenet, airing on the Lifetime Channel, with Demi Moore as a co-executive producer. On the show, de Cadenet has interviewed female guests such as Hillary Clinton, Lady Gaga, Portia de Rossi, Rita Wilson, Gwyneth Paltrow, Zoe Saldana and Jane Fonda. During the production of The Conversation, she developed a second show with Lifetime, a weekly late-night television talk show featuring de Cadenet entitled, Undone with @AmandadeCadenet. The show ran for six episodes in 2014. In 2018, she worked with Showtime to develop a pilot for a half-hour weekly news-magazine show tentatively titled Now What With Amanda de Cadenet. The show did not air. In 2019, she developed a ten-episode spin-off podcast of The Conversation in partnership with Spotify.

In 2016, de Cadenet founded Girlgaze, a global online, multi-sided platform which connects women and non-binary creatives with different businesses, companies and brands. Speaking on her role as CEO and past experience as a photographer, she said “I’m interested in the stories [women and nonbinary] people have to tell, because of my own experience of being shut out of so many creative opportunities because of my gender.” For this work, Fast Company named her one of 2020's "Most Creative People in Business."

In 2017, she released her second book and collection of photography, #girlgaze: How Girls See the World. This was followed in 2018 by a book of essays published by Harper Wave titled It's Messy: On Boys, Boobs, and Badass Women.

Personal life 
De Cadenet was born in Hampstead, London. She is the daughter of Anna and racing car driver Alain de Cadenet. De Cadenet lived in England until 1992, when she moved to the United States.

De Cadenet was married to Duran Duran bassist John Taylor from 1991 until 1997. At the time of their marriage, according to de Cadenet herself, she was only 19 and pregnant. Taylor and de Cadenet have one daughter, Atlanta Noo de Cadenet Taylor.

In 2006, she married guitarist Nick Valensi of American rock band the Strokes, after meeting at one of the band's performances in 2002. Their twin children Ella and Silvan were born in 2007.

Filmography

Talk shows 

 The Word (1990–1994); presenter
 The Big Breakfast (1994–1995); co-presenter
 The Conversation (2012, 2015–2016); host, executive producer
 Chelsea Lately (2012); guest host
 Project Runway (2014); guest judge
 The Talk (2014); guest co-host
 Undone with @AmandadeCadenet (2014); host, executive producer
 Now What With Amanda de Cadenet (unaired pilot, 2018); host, executive producer

Acting 

 The Rachel Papers (1989)
 The Blue Flame (1993)
 Four Rooms (1995)
 Grace of My Heart (1996)
 Fall (1997)
 The Hunger (1997); TV series, 1 episode
 Implicated (1999)
 Mascara (1999)
 Brokedown Palace (1999)
 Arrested Development (2013); TV series, 1 episode

Podcasts 

 The Conversation (2019–present); host

Other appearances 

 Whatever Happened to the Wild Child? (2005); TV documentary
 Barely Famous (2015); reality TV series, 1 episode
 Embrace: The Documentary (2016)
 Elles (2018); TV documentary

References

Bibliography

External links
 
 

1972 births
Living people
English film actresses
Photographers from London
British emigrants to the United States
English television presenters
English television producers
Actresses from London
People from Hampstead
20th-century English actresses
English television actresses
21st-century English actresses
English people of French descent
British women television producers
British television producers